Triángulo Dionisio Foianini (Dionisio Foianini Triangle) is the name given to Bolivia's border with Brazil and Paraguay.  Its importance lies in the fact that this border is marked in part by the Paraguay River and, as a result, Bolivia has a water route to the Atlantic Ocean that does not involve Brazil.  Consequently, Bolivia is planning on building a major port at the Puerto Busch within the triangle.

Currently Bolivian ships must pass along the eleven kilometre Tamengo Canal which connects Laguna Cáceres to the Paraguay River at the Brazilian city of Corumbá.

Geography of Bolivia
Bolivia–Brazil border
Bolivia–Paraguay border
Places